A by-election was held in the Legislative Assembly of Queensland seat of Southport on 20 June 1987. It was triggered by the death of sitting National Party member Doug Jennings on 9 April 1987, which until the death of Duncan Pegg in 2021, remained the most recent time a sitting Queensland MP has died. The seat was formerly a Liberal seat until 1980, and the by-election took place in the midst of the Joh for Canberra push. However, the campaign dwelled almost entirely on local matters.

Candidates
The Nationals selected Mick Veivers, a rugby league identity and acknowledged Sir Joh supporter, while the Liberals selected Keith Thompson, a City of Gold Coast alderman. Perennial independent candidate William Aabraham-Steer, who had contested McPherson and Moncrieff at various federal elections, also contested.

Results
The seat was retained by the National Party with the election of candidate and Australian former rugby league international Mick Veivers.

See also
List of Queensland state by-elections

References

1987 elections in Australia
Queensland state by-elections
1980s in Queensland